This is a list of people who have served as Lord Lieutenant of Derbyshire. Since 1689, all the Lord Lieutenants have also been Custos Rotulorum of Derbyshire.

Francis Hastings, 2nd Earl of Huntingdon
George Talbot, 6th Earl of Shrewsbury 3 July 1585 – 18 November 1590
Gilbert Talbot, 7th Earl of Shrewsbury 1590/1 – 8 May 1616
vacant
William Cavendish, 1st Earl of Devonshire 4 May 1619 – 3 March 1626 jointly with
William Cavendish, 2nd Earl of Devonshire 4 May 1619 – 20 June 1628
William Cavendish, 1st Earl of Newcastle 14 July 1628 – 13 November 1638
William Cavendish, 3rd Earl of Devonshire 13 November 1638 – 1684
Robert Leke, 3rd Earl of Scarsdale 15 January 1685 – 1687
Theophilus Hastings, 7th Earl of Huntingdon 23 December 1687 – 1688
William Cavendish, 1st Duke of Devonshire 17 May 1689 – 18 August 1707
William Cavendish, 2nd Duke of Devonshire 6 November 1707 – 1710
Nicholas Leke, 4th Earl of Scarsdale 5 September 1711 – 1714
William Cavendish, 2nd Duke of Devonshire 15 October 1714 – 4 June 1729
William Cavendish, 3rd Duke of Devonshire 31 October 1729 – 5 December 1755
William Cavendish, 4th Duke of Devonshire 21 January 1756 – 1764
John Manners, Marquess of Granby 23 June 1764 – 1766
Lord George Cavendish 17 June 1766 – 1782
William Cavendish, 5th Duke of Devonshire 2 July 1782 – 29 July 1811
William Cavendish, 6th Duke of Devonshire 27 August 1811 – 18 January 1858
William Cavendish, 7th Duke of Devonshire 20 February 1858 – 21 December 1891
Spencer Cavendish, 8th Duke of Devonshire 12 February 1892 – 24 March 1908
Victor Cavendish, 9th Duke of Devonshire 7 July 1908 – 6 May 1938
Edward Cavendish, 10th Duke of Devonshire 21 June 1938 – 26 November 1950
Sir Ian Peter Andrew Munro Walker-Okeover, 3rd Baronet 12 June 1951 – 1977
Sir Peter Hilton 31 January 1978 – 30 June 1994
Sir John Knollys Bather 1 July 1994 – 2009
William Tucker CVO 2009 - 2020
Elizabeth Fothergill CBE DL 2020–present

Deputy lieutenants
A deputy lieutenant of Derbyshire is commissioned by the Lord Lieutenant of Derbyshire. Deputy lieutenants support the work of the lord-lieutenant. There can be several deputy lieutenants at any time, depending on the population of the county. Their appointment does not terminate with the changing of the lord-lieutenant, but they usually retire at age 75.

19th Century
John Broadhurst, Esq.

References

 

Derbyshire
 
Derbyshire-related lists